Dental products are specially fabricated materials, designed for use in dentistry. There are many different types of dental products, and their characteristics vary according to their intended purpose.

Temporary dressings
A temporary dressing is a dental filling which is not intended to last in the long term. They are interim materials which may have therapeutic properties. A common use of temporary dressing occurs if root canal therapy is carried out over more than one appointment. In between each visit, the pulp canal system must be protected from contamination from the oral cavity, and a temporary filling is placed in the access cavity. Examples include:

 Zinc oxide eugenol—bactericidal, cheap and easy to remove. Eugenol is derived from oil of cloves, and has an obtundant effect on the tooth and decreases toothache. It is suitable temporary material providing there are no biting forces on it. It is also contraindicated if the final restorative material is composite because eugenol adversely effects the bond/polymerization process, also, when applied directly on the pulp tissue, it can produce chronic inflammation and result in pulp necrosis. Examples brands: Kalzinol, Sedanol.

Cements
Dental cements are used most often to bond indirect restorations such as crowns to the natural tooth surface. Examples include:

 Zinc Oxide cement—self setting and harden when in contact with saliva. Example brands: Cavit, Coltosol.
Zinc Phosphate cement
Zinc Polycarboxylate cement—Adheres to enamel and dentin. Example brands: PolyF.
Glass Ionomer cement
Resin-based cement
Copper-based cement

Impression materials

Dental impressions are negative imprints of teeth and oral soft tissues from which a positive representation can be cast. They are used in prosthodontics (to make dentures), orthodontics, restorative dentistry, dental implantology and oral and maxillofacial surgery.

 Rigidity-   Inelastic (rigid) impression materials are used with patients with shallow undercuts.
 Elasticity- Elastic impression materials are used in patients with deep undercuts as it must be flexible enough to reach the end-point of the undercut.
These two properties are essential because patients have varying soft-tissue undercuts (shallow or deep undercuts). In order to obtain an accurate impression, a suitable property of impression material must be used. Impression materials are designed to be liquid or semi-solid when first mixed, then set hard in a few minutes, leaving imprints of oral structures.

Common dental impression materials include:
 sodium alginate
 polyether
 silicones
Historically these products were used as impression materials:
 plaster of Paris 
 zinc oxide eugenol
 agar

Lining materials
Dental lining materials are used during restorations of large cavities, and are placed between the remaining tooth structure and the restoration material. The purpose of this is to protect the dentinal tubules and the sensitive pulp, forming a barrier-like structure. After drilling the caries out of the tooth, the dentist applies a thin layer (approximately 1/2mm) to the base of the tooth, followed by light curing. Another layer might be applied if the cavity is very large and deep.

There are many functions to dental lining materials, some of which are listed below:

 Lining materials protect the weak tooth from post-operative hypersensitivity, reducing patient discomfort and allowing the tooth to heal at a faster rate after the procedure.
 Some dental restorative materials such as acrylic monomers in resin-based materials and phosphoric acid in silicate materials may pose toxic and irritable effects to the pulp. Lining materials protect the tooth from the aforementioned irritants.
 Lining materials serve as an insulating layer to the tooth pulp from sudden changes in temperature when the patient takes hot or cold food, protecting it from potential pain resulting from thermal conductivity.
 Additionally, lining materials are electrically insulating, preventing corrosion by galvanic cell in the event where two dissimilar metals (e.g.: gold or amalgam) are placed next to each other.

Type 
Calcium Hydroxide

Calcium Hydroxide has a relatively low compressive strength and a viscous consistency making them difficult to apply to cavities in thick sections, a common technique used to overcome this issue would be to apply a thin sub-lining of a calcium hydroxide lining and then building up with zinc phosphate prior to amalgam condensation. Generates a relatively high pH environment around area surrounding the cement due to calcium hydroxide leaking out thus making it bactericidal. It also has a unique effect of initiating calcification and stimulating the formation of secondary dentine due to an irritation effect of the pulp tissues by the cement. It is also radio-opaque and acts as a good thermal and electrical insulation. However, due to its low compressive strength it is unable to withstand amalgam packing thus a strong cement base material should be placed above it to counter this. Calcium silicate-based liners have become alternatives to calcium hydroxide and a preferred material among practitioners for its bioactive and sealing properties; the material triggers a biological response and results in formation of bonding with the tissue. Commonly used as pulp capping agents and lining materials for silicate and resin-based filling materials.

It is usually supplied as 2 pastes, a glycol salicylate and another paste containing Zinc Oxide with Calcium Hydroxide. On mixing a chelate compounds are formed. Light activated versions are also available which contains polymersation activators, hydroexyethyl methacrylate, dimethacrylate which when light activated will result in a light activated polymerization reaction of a modified methacrylate monomer.

Polycarboxylate cement

Polycarboxylate cement have decent compressive strength to resists amalgam condensation and are acidic but less acidic than phosphate cements due to it having a higher molecular weight and polyacrylic acid being a weaker acid than phosphoric acid. They also form a strong bond with dentine and enamel allowing it to form a coronal seal. In addition it is an electrical and thermal insulator while also releasing fluoride rendering it bacteriostatic, furthermore it being radio-opaque makes it an excellent lining material.

Care has to be taken in handling such material as it has a strong bond with stainless steel instruments once it sets.

Commonly used as luting agents or as cavity base materials, however they tend to be rubbery during its setting reaction and adhere to stainless steel instruments thus most operators would prefer not to use them in deep cavities.

It is usually supplied as a power containing Zinc Oxide and a liquid containing aqueous Polyacrylic acid. The reaction consists of an acid base reaction with Zinc oxide reacting with the acid groups in polyacid to form a reaction product of unreacted zinc oxide cores bound by a salt matrix with polyacrylic acid chains cross linking with zinc ions.

Glass ionomer

It has the strongest compressive and tensile strength out of all the linings, thus it can withstand amalgam condensation in high stress bearing areas such as class II cavities. GI is used as a lining material as it is very compatible with most restorative materials, insulates thermally and electrically and adheres to enamel and dentine. Lining GI contains glass of smaller particle sizes in comparison to its adhesive restorative mix to allow formation of a thinner film. Some variations are also radiopaque which makes it good for X ray cavity detection. In addition, GI is bacteriostatic due to its fluoride release from un-reacted glass cores.

GIs are usually used as a lining material for composite resins or as luting agents for orthodontic bands.

The reaction is an acid-base reaction between calcium-aluminum-silicate glass powder and polyacrylic acid.  They come in a powder and liquid which are mixed on a pad or in capsules which are for single usage. The resin-modified GIs contain a photo-initiator usually camphorquinone and an amide, and are light cured with a LED light curing unit. Setting takes place by a combination of acid-base reaction and chemically activated polymerization.

Zinc oxide eugenol

Zinc oxide eugenol has the lowest compressive and tensile strength in relative to the rest of the liners thus this lining should be limited to small or non stress bearing areas such as Class V cavities. This cavity lining is often used with a high strength base to provide strength, rigidity and thermal insulation. Zinc oxide eugenol can be used as linings in deep cavities without causing harm to the pulp, due to its obtundant effect on the pulp as well as its bactericidal properties due to Zinc. However eugenol may have an effect on resin based filling materials as it interferes with the polymerization and occasionally causes discoloration, thus caution should be taken when using both in tandem. It is also radio-opaque allowing fillings to be visible by X-rays.

Zinc oxide eugenol is usually used as a temporary filling/luting agent due to its low compressive strength and thus easily removed or as a lining for amalgam as it is incompatible with composites resins.

It is supplied as a two paste system. Equal length of 2 pastes are dispensed into a paper pad and mixed.

Restorative materials

Dental restorative materials are used to replace tooth structure loss, usually due to dental caries (dental cavities), but also tooth wear and dental trauma. On other occasions, such materials may be used for cosmetic purposes to alter the appearance of an individual's teeth.

There are many challenges for the physical properties of the ideal dental restorative material. The goal of research and development in restorative materials is to develop the ideal restorative material. The ideal restorative material would be identical to natural tooth structure in strength, adherence, and appearance. The properties of an ideal filling material can be divided into four categories: physical properties, biocompatibility, aesthetics and application.

 Requisite physical properties include low thermal conductivity and expansion, resistance to different categories of forces and wear such as attrition and abrasion, and resistance to chemical erosion. There must also be good bonding strength to the tooth. Everyday masticatory forces and conditions must be withstood without material fatigue.
Biocompatibility refers to how well the material coexists with the biological equilibrium of the tooth and body systems. Since fillings are in close contact with mucosa, tooth, and pulp, biocompatibility is very important. Common problems with some of the current dental materials include chemical leakage from the material, pulpal irritation and less commonly allergy. Some of the byproducts of the chemical reactions during different stages of material hardening need to be considered.
Radiopacity in dental materials is an important property that allows for distinguishing restorations from teeth and surrounding structures, assessing the absorption of materials into bone structure, and detecting cement dissolution or other failures that could cause harm to the patient. Cements, composites, endodontic sealers, bone grafts, and acrylic resins all benefit from the addition of radiopaque materials. Examples of these materials include zinc oxide, zirconium dioxide, titanium dioxide, barium sulfate, and ytterbium(III) fluoride.
 Ideally, filling materials should match the surrounding tooth structure in shade, translucency, and texture.
 Dental operators require materials that are easy to manipulate and shape, where the chemistry of any reactions that need to occur are predictable or controllable.

Direct restorative materials
Direct restorations are ones which are placed directly into a cavity on a tooth, and shaped to fit. The chemistry of the setting reaction for direct restorative materials is designed to be more biologically compatible. Heat and byproducts generated cannot damage the tooth or patient, since the reaction needs to take place while in contact with the tooth during restoration. This ultimately limits the strength of the materials, since harder materials need more energy to manipulate.
The type of filling (restorative) material used has a minor effect on how long they last.  The majority of clinical studies indicate the annual failure rates (AFRs) are between 1% and 3% with tooth colored fillings on back teeth.  Note that root canaled (endodontically) treated teeth have AFR's between 2% and 12%.  The main reasons for failure are cavities that occur around the filling and fracture of the real tooth.  These are related to personal cavity risk and factors like grinding teeth (bruxism).

Amalgam

Amalgam is a metallic filling material composed from a mixture of mercury (from 43% to 54%) and powdered alloy made mostly of silver, tin, zinc and copper, commonly called the amalgam alloy. Amalgam does not adhere to tooth structure without the aid of cements or use of techniques which lock in the filling, using the same principles as a dovetail joint.

Amalgam is still used extensively in many parts of the world because of its cost effectiveness, superior strength and longevity. However, the metallic colour is not aesthetically pleasing and tooth coloured alternatives are continually emerging with increasingly comparable properties.  Due to the known toxicity of the element mercury, there is some controversy about the use of amalgams.  The Swedish government banned the use of mercury amalgam in June 2009.
Research has shown that, while amalgam use is controversial and may increase mercury levels in the human body, these levels are below safety threshold levels established by the WHO and the EPA.  However, there are certain subpopulations who, due to inherited genetic variabilities, exhibit sensitivity to mercury levels lower than these threshold levels.  These particular individuals may experience adverse effects caused by amalgam restoration.  These include neural defects, mainly caused by impaired neurotransmitter processing.

Composite resin

Composite resin fillings (also called white fillings) are a mixture of nanoparticles or powdered glass and plastic resin, and can be made to resemble the appearance of the natural tooth.  Although cosmetically superior to amalgam fillings, composite resin fillings are usually more expensive. Bis-GMA based resins contain Bisphenol A, a known endocrine disrupter chemical, and may contribute to the development of breast cancer. However, it has been demonstrated that the extremely low levels of bis-GMA released by composite restorations do not cause a significant increase in markers of renal injury, when compared to amalgam restorations.  That is, there is no added risk of renal or endocrine injury in choosing composite restorations over amalgams. PEX-based materials do not contain Bisphenol A and are the least cytotoxic material available.

Most modern composite resins are light-cured photopolymers, meaning that they harden with light exposure. They can then be polished to achieve maximum aesthetic results.  Composite resins experience a very small amount of shrinkage upon curing, causing the material to pull away from the walls of the cavity preparation.  This makes the tooth slightly more vulnerable to microleakage and recurrent decay. Microleakage can be minimized or eliminated by utilizing proper handling techniques and appropriate material selection.

In some circumstances, less tooth structure can be removed compared to preparation for other dental materials such as amalgam and many of the indirect methods of restoration. This is because composite resins bind to enamel (and dentin too, although not as well) via a micromechanical bond. As conservation of tooth structure is a key ingredient in tooth preservation, many dentists prefer placing materials like composite instead of amalgam fillings whenever possible.

Generally, composite fillings are used to fill a carious lesion involving highly visible areas (such as the central incisors or any other teeth that can be seen when smiling) or when conservation of tooth structure is a top priority.

The bond of composite resin to tooth, is especially affected by moisture contamination and cleanliness of the prepared surface. Other materials can be selected when restoring teeth where moisture control techniques are not effective.

Glass ionomer cement

The concept of using "smart" materials in dentistry has attracted a lot of attention in recent years. Conventional glass-ionomer (GI) cements have a large number of applications in dentistry. They are biocompatible with the dental pulp to some extent.
Clinically, this material was initially used as a biomaterial to replace the lost osseous tissues in the human body.

These fillings are a mixture of glass and an organic acid.  Although they are tooth-colored, glass ionomers vary in translucency.  Although glass ionomers can be used to achieve an aesthetic result, their aesthetic potential does not measure up to that provided by composite resins.

The cavity preparation of a glass ionomer filling is the same as a composite resin. However, one of the advantages of GI compared to other restorative materials is that they can be placed in cavities without any need for bonding agents (4).

Conventional glass ionomers are chemically set via an acid-base reaction.  Upon mixing of the material components, there is no light cure needed to harden the material once placed in the cavity preparation.  After the initial set, glass ionomers still need time to fully set and harden.

Advantages:

 Glass ionomer can be placed in cavities without any need for bonding agents .
  They are not subject to shrinkage and microleakage, as the bonding mechanism is an acid-base reaction and not a polymerization reaction.(GICs do not undergo great dimensional changes in a moist environment in response to heat or cold and it appears heating results only in water movement within the structure of the material. These exhibit shrinkage in a dry environment at temperature higher than 50C, which is similar to the behavior of dentin.
 Glass ionomers contain and release fluoride, which is important to preventing carious lesions.  Furthermore, as glass ionomers release their fluoride, they can be "recharged" by the use of fluoride-containing toothpaste.  Hence, they can be used as a treatment modality for patients who are at high risk for caries.  Newer formulations of glass ionomers that contain light-cured resins can achieve a greater aesthetic result, but do not release fluoride as well as conventional glass ionomers.

Disadvantages:

The most important disadvantage is lack of adequate strength and toughness. In an attempt to improve the mechanical properties of the conventional GI, resin-modified ionomers have been marketed.
GICs are usually weak after setting and are not stable in water; however, they become stronger with the progression of reactions and become more resistant to moisture.
New generations: The aim is tissue regeneration and use of biomaterial in the form of a powder or solution is to induce local tissue repair. These bioactive materials release chemical agents in the form of dissolved ions or growth factors such as bone morphogenic protein, which stimulates activate cells.

Glass ionomers are about as expensive as composite resin.  The fillings do not wear as well as composite resin fillings.  Still, they are generally considered good materials to use for root caries and for sealants.

Resin modified glass-ionomer cement (RMGIC)
A combination of glass-ionomer and composite resin, these fillings are a mixture of glass, an organic acid, and resin monomers that harden when light cured (light-activated polymerization besides the acid-base reaction of conventional glass-ionomer). The cost is similar to composite resin. It holds up better than glass ionomer, but not as well as composite resin, and is not recommended for biting surfaces of adult teeth, or when control of moisture cannot be achieved.

Generally, resin modified glass-ionomer cements can achieve a better aesthetic result than conventional glass ionomers, but not as good as pure composites.

Compomers

 Another combination of composite resin and glass ionomer technology, with focus lying towards the composite resin end of the spectrum. Compomers are essentially made up of filler, dimethacrylate monomer, difunctional resin, photo-activator and initiator, and hydrophilic monomers. The primary reason of the addition of filler is to decrease the proportion of resin and increase the mechanical strength besides improving the material's appearance.

Although compomers have better mechanical and aesthetic properties than RMGIC, they have few disadvantages which limit their applications.  
 Compomers have weaker wear properties.
 Compomers are not adhesive, therefore they require bonding materials. Compomers themselves cannot adhere to the tooth tissue due to the presence of resin which can make it shrink on polymerisation. As a result, any bonding attempted will be disrupted at this stage.
 Compomers release fluoride at low level, so they cannot act as a fluoride reservoir.
 Compomers have high staining susceptibility. Uptake of oral fluid causes them to show staining soon after placement. 
Due to its relatively weaker mechanical properties, Compomers are unfit for stress-bearing restorations but can be used in the deciduous dentition where lower loads are anticipated.

Cermets 

Dental cermets, also known as silver cermets, were created to improve the wear resistance and hardness of glass ionomer cements (mentioned above) through the addition of silver. While the incorporation of silver achieved this, cermets have poorer aesthetics, appearing metallic rather than white. Cermets also have a similar compressive strength, flexural strength, and solubility as glass ionomer cements, some of the main limiting factors for both materials. Clinical studies have shown cermets perform poorly. All these disadvantages led to the decline in the use of this restorative material.

Below is a summary of the advantages and disadvantages of dental cermets.

Advantages:

 Radio-opaque - this helps with identification of secondary caries when future radiographs are taken as there will be a greater contrast between the cermet and tooth tissue on the radiographic image
 Adheres directly to tooth tissue
 Higher wear resistance than glass ionomer cements (GICs)
 Greater hardness than GICs

Disadvantages:

 Low compressive strength
 Low flexural strength
 Soluble
 Poor aesthetics
 Poorer fluoride release than GICs
 Poor clinical performance

Indirect restorative materials

Indirect restorations are ones where the tooth or teeth to receive the restoration are first prepared, then a dental impression is taken and sent to a dental technician who fabricates the restoration according to the dentist's prescription.

Porcelain fillings are hard, but can cause wear on opposing teeth.  They are brittle and are not always recommended for molar fillings.  They are hard and rigid thus able to resist abrasion forces, are brittle due to surface irregularities, porosities, tendency to undergo static fatigue, and is good aesthetically as it mimics appearance of natural teeth due to various levels of shades.  Porcelain materials can be strengthened by soaking fired material in molten salt to allow exchange of sodium and potassium ions on the surface as this successfully create compressive stresses on the outer layer, by controlling cooling after firing, and by the use of pure alumina inserts, a core of alumina or alumina powder, as they act as crack stoppers and are highly compatible to porcelain.

Tooth colored dental composite materials are either used as direct filling or as construction material of an indirect inlay. It is usually cured by light.

Nano-ceramic particles embedded in a resin matrix, are less brittle and therefore less likely to crack, or chip, than all-ceramic indirect fillings; they absorb the shock of chewing more like natural teeth, and more like resin or gold fillings, than do ceramic fillings; and at the same time more resistant to wear than all-resin indirect fillings. These are available in blocks for use with CAD-CAM systems.

Gold fillings have excellent durability, wear well, and do not cause excessive wear to the opposing teeth, but they do conduct heat and cold, which can be irritating.  There are two categories of gold fillings, cast gold fillings (gold inlays and onlays) made with 14 or 18 kt gold, and gold foil made with pure 24 kt gold that is burnished layer by layer. For years, they have been considered the benchmark of restorative dental materials.  Recent advances in dental porcelains and consumer focus on aesthetic results have caused demand for gold fillings to drop in favor of advanced composites and porcelain veneers and crowns.  Gold fillings are sometimes quite expensive; yet, they do last a very long time—which can mean gold restorations are less costly and painful in the long run.  It is not uncommon for a gold crown to last 30 years.

Other historical fillings
Lead fillings were used in the 18th century, but became unpopular in the 19th century because of their softness. This was before lead poisoning was understood.

According to American Civil War-era dental handbooks from the mid-19th century, since the early 19th century metallic fillings had been used, made of lead, gold, tin, platinum, silver, aluminum, or amalgam.  A pellet was rolled slightly larger than the cavity, condensed into place with instruments, then shaped and polished in the patient's mouth.  The filling was usually left "high", with final condensation—"tamping down"—occurring while the patient chewed food.  Gold foil was the most popular and preferred filling material during the Civil War. Tin and amalgam were also popular due to lower cost, but were held in lower regard.

One survey of dental practices in the mid-19th century catalogued dental fillings found in the remains of seven Confederate soldiers from the U.S. Civil War; they were made of:
Gold foil: Preferred because of its durability and safety.
Platinum: Was rarely used because it was too hard, inflexible and difficult to form into foil.
Aluminum: A material which failed because of its lack of malleability but has been added to some amalgams.
Tin and iron: Believed to have been a very popular filling material during the Civil War. Tin foil was recommended when a cheaper material than gold was requested by the patient, however tin wore down rapidly and even if it could be replaced cheaply and quickly, there was a concern, specifically from Harris, that it would oxidise in the mouth and thus cause a recurrence of caries. Due to the blackening, tin was only recommended for posterior teeth.
Thorium: Radioactivity was unknown at that time, and the dentist probably thought he was working with tin.
Lead and tungsten mixture, probably coming from shotgun pellets. Lead was rarely used in the 19th century, it is soft and quickly worn down by mastication, and had known harmful health effects.

Acrylic polymers 
Acrylics are used in the fabrication of dentures, artificial teeth, impression trays, maxillofacial / orthodontic appliances and temporary (provisional) restorations, however they can not be used as tooth filling materials because they can lead to pulpitis and periodontitis as they may generate heat and acids during (setting) curing, and in addition they shrink.

Failure of dental restorations

Fillings have a finite lifespan; composites appear to have a higher failure rate than amalgam over five to seven years.  How well people keep their teeth clean and avoid cavities is probably a more important factor than the material chosen for the restoration.

Evaluation and regulation of dental materials
The Nordic Institute of Dental Materials (NIOM) evaluates dental materials in the Nordic countries. This research and testing institution are accredited to perform several test procedures for dental products. In Europe, dental materials are classified as medical devices according to the Medical Devices Directive. In USA, the U.S. Food and Drug Administration is the regulatory body for dental products.

References 

User Guide of Dental Impression Material: https://www.youtube.com/watch?v=-keGMbCHC2A
Dental Materials Fact Sheet, Dental Board of California, May 2004

Dental materials
Restorative dentistry